Kollel Yad Shaul is a Charedi yeshiva  based in Johannesburg, South Africa. 
It played a pioneering role in the growth and spread of Torah in South Africa. 
It has produced numerous serving Rabbis and educators,  and provides a Beit Midrash open to the wider community.

Established in the early 1970's, it was originally based in Yeoville, Johannesburg until 2000, when it moved to the suburb of The Gardens. 
Rabbi Boruch Dov Grossnass  headed "The Kollel", as it is known, for 40 years; Rabbi Grossnass took over from the late Rabbi Mordechai Shakovitzky when the latter moved to Israel. From 2018 -2021 it was headed by Rabbi Baruch Rubanowitz.

The Kollel is also well known for its lending library. It previously housed the Yeshiva Pri Eitz Chaim.

See also
Jewish education in South Africa under History of the Jews in South Africa
Orthodox yeshivas in South Africa

References
kollelyadshaul.co.za

Jews and Judaism in Johannesburg
Orthodox yeshivas in South Africa
Education in Johannesburg